Yates is a Scandinavian or Anglo-Saxon surname common among the Irish, and best associated with the Poet Laureate of Ireland, William Butler Yeats, and his family of painters, including founders of Dun Emer Press and the Abbey Theatre. Notable people with the surname include:

Entertainment

Art and literature
Dornford Yates, the pseudonym of the English novelist, Cecil William Mercer (1885–1960)
Edmund Yates (1831–1894), Edinburgh-born novelist and dramatist
Elizabeth Yates (author) (1905–2001), American author
Fred Yates (1922–2008), English painter
Frederic Yates (1854–1919), English painter
J. Michael Yates (born 1938), Canadian poet and dramatist
Jason Yates (born 1972), American visual artist
Myriam Yates (born 1971), Canadian artist
Richard Yates (novelist) (1926–1992), American novelist and short story writer

Music, theatre, film and television
Aaron Dontez Yates (born 1971), American rapper, known as Tech N9ne
Billy Yates (fl. 1992–), American country singer
Cassie Yates (born 1951), American television actress
David Yates (born 1963), English film and television director
Elizabeth Yates (actress) (1799–1860), English actress
Francesco Yates (born 1995), Canadian singer
Frederick Henry Yates (1797–1842), English actor and theatre manager
Herbert Yates (1880–1966), founder and president of Republic Pictures
Lucky Yates (born 1967), American actor, voice actor, puppeteer, and comedian
Mary Anne Yates (1728–1787), English tragic actress
Peter Yates (1929–2011), English film director
Reggie Yates (born 1983), English actor, television presenter, and radio DJ
Richard Yates (actor) (c. 1706–1796), English comic actor 
Theodosia Yates (1815–1904), Australian actor and singer

News media
Alastair Yates (1952–2018), English BBC News presenter
Brock Yates (1933–2016), automotive magazine reporter/editor
Jess Yates (1918–1993), English television presenter
Paula Yates (1959–2000), British television presenter

Sports
Adam Yates (cyclist) (born 1992), English cyclist
Adam Yates (footballer) (born 1983), English association football player
Billy Yates (American football) (born 1980), American Football player
Dorian Yates (born 1962), professional English bodybuilder
Frederick Yates (chess player) (1884–1932), English chess master who won the British Championship six times
Gary Yates (cricketer) (born 1967), Lancashire cricket player
Janet Yates, Irish archer
Kevin Yates (born 1972), rugby union prop forward
Kirby Yates (born 1987), American baseball player for the San Diego Padres of Major League Baseball
Robert Yates (NASCAR) (born ca 1943, fl. 1961–2007), former owner of Yates Racing, NASCAR racing team
Ryan Yates, (born 1997), English association football player
Sammy Yates, English association football player
Sean Yates (born 1960), English cyclist
Simon Yates (cyclist) (born 1992), English cyclist
Simon Yates (golfer) (born 1970), British golfer
Simon Yates (mountaineer) (born 1963), English mountaineer
Steve Yates (born 1970), English association football player
Steven Yates (born 1983), rugby union player from New Zealand
T. J. Yates (born 1987), American football player
Tony Yates (1937–2020), American basketball player and coach
Tyler Yates (born 1977), major league baseball pitcher
Wayne Yates (born 1937), NBA player and college basketball coach

Politics

United States
Abraham Yates (1724-1796), American Continental Congressman
Frederick Yates (politician) (1914-1971), Michigan politician
Glenn Yates Jr. (1927-2022), Virginia politician and architect
Harry D. Yates (1903-1996), Acting New York Comptroller 1941
John P. Yates (1921-2017), Georgia politician
John Van Ness Yates (1779-1839), New York Secretary of State 1818–1826
Joseph C. Yates (1768-1837), former governor of New York
Mary Carlin Yates (b. 1946), U.S. ambassador
Peter W. Yates, American attorney and Continental Congress delegate
Richard Yates (governor), Illinois politician
Richard Yates (son), Illinois politician, his son
Robert Yates (politician), anti-Federalist American politician
Sally Yates, former U.S. Department of Justice official 
Sidney R. Yates, politician from the state of Illinois

Other countries
Dianne Yates, New Zealand politician
Elizabeth Yates (mayor), first female mayor in the British Empire
John Ashton Yates, UK member of parliament
Ivan Yates, senior Irish politician

Science
David Gilbert Yates, American eye, ear and throat surgeon
Frances Yates, noted English historian
Frank Yates (1902–1994), English statistician
JoAnne Yates (born 1951), American Professor of Managerial Communication
Ricardo Baeza-Yates (born 1961), Chilean computer scientist
Samuel Yates, mathematician
Tyler Yates, physician

Military
Charles Yates (1808–1870), brigadier-general during the American Civil War
Donald Norton Yates (1909–1993), USAAF officer and meteorologist to Eisenhower in WWII 
Earl P. Yates (born 1923), US Admiral
Elmer P. Yates (1917–2011), US Army engineer general
George Yates (1843–1876), US Army officer and friend of George Armstrong Custer
Harry Yates (RAF officer) (1896–1968), Canadian RAF officer
James Yates (cricketer) (1883–1929), cricketer and British Indian Army officer
Julian E. Yates (1871–1953), US Army officer and chaplain
Peter Yates (architect) (1920–1982), British architect and RAF officer

Miscellaneous
Andrea Yates, woman acquitted, by reason of insanity, of drowning her five children
James Yates, English Unitarian minister
John Yates, former Assistant Commissioner in the Metropolitan Police Service
Joseph Brooks Yates, English merchant and antiquary
Richard Vaughan Yates, founder of Prince's Park, Liverpool
Robert Lee Yates, American serial killer
William Yates, fifth president of the College of William & Mary
Thomas, John, Albert and William Yates (1860-1917), the largest organizers of production on the Ural in Russia of the 19-20 century.

Fiction 
 Detective Yates, recurring character in the skit comedy series The Kids in the Hall
 The Hon. John Yates from Mansfield Park by Jane Austen
 Kasidy Yates, a recurring character in the science fiction TV series Star Trek: Deep Space Nine
 Lise Yates, from the British TV Sitcom Red Dwarf
 Captain Mike Yates, British science fiction television series Doctor Who
 Rowdy Yates, Rawhide TV series (CBS 1959–1966)
 Yates Noll, villain from Terrier, Book 1 of Tamora Pierce's Beka Cooper Series
 Richard Yates, a 2010 novel by Tao Lin

See also
Yeats (disambiguation)
 Yeates

References

English-language surnames